Julieta Borghi  (born ) is a retired Argentine female volleyball player, who played as a wing spiker.

She was part of the Argentina women's national volleyball team at the  2002 FIVB Volleyball Women's World Championship in Germany, 2003 FIVB Volleyball World Grand Prix, and 2006 Women's Pan-American Volleyball Cup.

At club level she played for Banco Nacion,

References

1982 births
Living people
Argentine women's volleyball players
Wing spikers